William Donaldson (1935–2005)  was a British theatrical producer, satirist, writer and playboy.

William or Bill Donaldson may also refer to:

William Donaldson (died 1813), English-born American founder of Donaldsonville, Louisiana
William H. Donaldson (born 1931), former chairman of the U.S. Securities and Exchange Commission
William John Donaldson (born 1958), chess player
William L. Donaldson (1899–1977), American politician
John William Donaldson (1811–1861), English philologist and biblical critic
William Donaldson (cricketer) (1871–1923), Scottish cricketer for Oxford University
Bill Donaldson (cricketer) (1923–1999), Australian cricketer
Willie Donaldson (footballer) (1920–1977), Scottish footballer
Bill Donaldson (rugby union) (1871–1923), Scottish rugby union player